Bahraich railway station is a main railway station in Bahraich district, Uttar Pradesh. Its code is BRK. It serves the city of Bahraich.

Architecture and Facilities
The station consists of three platforms, two for broad gauge, and one for metre gauge. The platforms are well sheltered.

It has all facilities that a standard railway station should have like water, sanitation, recreation, seating lounge, circulating areas etc.

Route
Bahraich is on Indian Railways route map, and provides a newly constructed broad-gauge line, running from Gonda to Bahraich. The work of electrification is done by North Eastern Railways.

Meter Gauge
In addition to broad gauge line, the last conserved meter gauge railway line of North Eastern Railways are also being operated from Bahraich railway station. 
Until year 2018, the entire route from Gonda Jn. to Izzatnagar was meter gauge and railways was running several MG Reserved and unreserved trains on this route. But later in 2016 railway budget it was planned to convert the 60 KM section of Gonda Jn. to Bahraich from meter gauge to Broad Gauge. After this gauge conversion MG trains towards direction of Mailani & Nanpara started to being operated from Bahraich Railway Station. At present only a few trains are running on Meter Gauge section. The Mailani Railway section is one of most beautiful railway routes in Uttar Pradesh as it passes through the Dudhwa Wildlife sanctuary & tiger reserve. In 2020 due to conflict between Indian Railways & Forest reserve in context of security of wild animals, forest reserve appealed a plea in high court to stop the trains on this iconic section. After the hearing court ordered a stay on train movement on this section. But after some months again trains are started as the matter resolved between railways and forest department.

Operations
The trains on the section are running from 9 November 2018.

State rail minister Manoj Sinha flagged off 75023 GD–BRK Spl. DEMU train from Gonda Junction.

Jarwal Road, Bahraich (UP) is a broad-gauge station 55 kilometers (34 miles) from district headquarters, and lies on Gorakhpur–Lucknow main line. Although Jarwal road railway station is not connected with Bahraich railway station.
Demand for direct train connectivity was at its peak since Budget was sanctioned in 1997 (21 years ago), despite no additional work started, including land acquisition work which was pending from years.

Khalilabad Railway Line
The central cabinet in year 2019 parliament sessions sanctioned a total budget of 4,939.78 crore.
The total length of the new broad gauge line will be 240.26 km, an official statement said.
The new line, which will cross towns such as Bhinga, Shravasti, Balrampur, Uttraula, Domariyaganj, Mehdawal and Bansi, and is likely expected to be completed by 2024-25.

Goods loading/unloading Yard
The goods unloading station of BRK is constructed in Chilwariya, a small town at a distance of 12 KM from city railway station. This Unloading/loading station was created there to majorly facilitate the supply of Sugarcanes & sugar from/to Simbhavli Sugar Mills. Apart from these fertilizers, oils are also being transported here on regular basis.

References 

Railway stations in Bahraich district
Lucknow NER railway division
Bahraich

2.^ https://www.amarujala.com/uttar-pradesh/gonda/train-electeic-gonda-news-lko6133215124
3.^ https://www.jagran.com/uttar-pradesh/gonda-crs-investigate-gonda-bahraich-electric-work-22373634.html